Richard Peter (10 May 1895 – 3 October 1977) was a German press photographer and photojournalist.  He is best known for his photographs of Dresden just after the end of the Second World War.

Life
Richard Peter was born and raised in Klein Jenkwitz, Silesia, where as a teenager he worked as a smith and a miner while dabbling in photography.  He was drafted into the German army in 1914 to serve in the First World War.  After the war he settled in Halle and later in Dresden. He joined the labor movement and the Communist Party of Germany, and during the 1920s and early 1930s his photographs were published in various left-wing publications.  Because of this, he was promptly barred from working as a press photographer when the Nazi Party rose to power in 1933. During the Third Reich, he worked in advertising, before being drafted again to serve in the Second World War.

Peter returned to Dresden in September 1945 to find the city destroyed after the bombing of Dresden of February 1945.  His personal archive and equipment had been completely destroyed in the raids.  Starting over with borrowed equipment, he began to document the damage to the city and the beginnings of its reconstruction.  His photographs were published in 1949 in a volume called Dresden, eine Kamera klagt an ("Dresden, a photographic accusation").

Dresden was in the Soviet occupation zone, and Peter's later life was in the new communist East Germany. In 1949, Peter was expelled from the ruling Socialist Unity Party of Germany, the successor of the Communist Party, when he investigated corrupt party officials.  He continued to work as a freelance art photographer in Dresden until his death in 1977, and eventually won some international recognition for his work. Peter's more than 5,000 negatives and prints were acquired by the Saxon State Library in 1983.

Gallery

Sources

 Deutsches Historisches Museum Berlin, Richard Peter sen. (retrieved 11 February 2005).

1895 births
1977 deaths
German communists
German Army personnel of World War I
German military personnel of World War II
Photographers from Dresden
German miners
People from the Province of Silesia